"Clocks" is a song by British rock band Coldplay. It was written and composed as a collaboration among all the members of the band for their second album, A Rush of Blood to the Head. The song is built around a piano riff, and features cryptic lyrics concerning themes of contrast and urgency. Several remixes of the track exist, and its riff has been widely sampled.

The record was initially released in the United States as the album's second single on 11 November 2002, reaching number 29 on the Billboard Hot 100 and number nine on the Billboard Modern Rock Tracks chart. It was then released in the United Kingdom on 17 March 2003 as the third single from A Rush of Blood to the Head, reaching number nine on the UK Singles Chart. Music critics praised the song's piano melody, and it went on to win Record of the Year at the 2004 Grammy Awards.

"Clocks" is considered to be one of Coldplay's signature songs, and is often ranked among the greatest songs of the 2000s and of all time. In 2010, the single was placed at 490th on Rolling Stone's "500 Greatest Songs of All Time" list. In 2011, NME placed it amongst the "150 Best Tracks of the Past 15 Years".

Background and writing 
"Clocks" was written and composed during the late stages of production of Coldplay's second album, A Rush of Blood to the Head. A riff popped into Chris Martin's mind late one night in Liverpool when he came into the studio, where he then developed it on piano. According to singer Chris Martin, "Clocks" was inspired by the English rock band Muse. Martin presented the riff to the band's guitarist, Jonny Buckland, who then added a layer of guitar chords to the basic track: "He picked up his guitar [a sure sign that he likes a song] and played these brilliant chords ... It was like a chemical reaction process."

Before writing and composing "Clocks", the band had already written ten songs for the album. However, because A Rush of Blood to the Head was nearing completion, they thought it was too late to include the new song on it. Hence, they recorded a demo and saved it with other unfinished tracks, labelling it "Songs for #3"; the band intended these tracks for what would be their third album.

By June 2002, Coldplay were ready to present the new album to their record label Parlophone. However, Martin felt it was "rubbish"; they were so far from being completely satisfied with the album that both the band and Parlophone delayed the release. After a headlining tour, Coldplay went on working on "Songs for #3." Phil Harvey, the band's manager and a friend of Martin, heard it and pressed him to rework "Clocks" immediately. Harvey pointed out that, with its lyrics that speak of urgency, its meaning contradicted Martin's idea of stashing the track. Thus persuaded by Harvey, Martin then further developed "Clocks", while other band members supplemented his work with their ideas based on the main piano track, adding bass and drums. Coldplay recorded the song very quickly because the schedule of A Rush of Blood to the Head had already been delayed; the album was released two months later.

Composition 
"Clocks" is an alternative rock and psychedelic rock song. It features a repeating piano melody and a minimalist, atmospheric soundscape of synthesizer pads, drums, electric guitar, and bass guitar. Martin applied an ostinato, as well as a descending scale on the piano chord progression, which switches from major to minor chords.

The themes of the lyrics include contrast, contradictions and urgency. According to Jon Wiederhon of MTV News, "Martin seems to address the helplessness of being in a dysfunctional relationship he doesn't necessarily want to escape." The lyrics are cryptic; the ending lines of the second verse emphasise contradicting emotion: "Come out upon my seas/Cursed missed opportunities/Am I a part of the cure/Or am I part of the disease?" The song's title also "metaphorically alludes" to its lyrics, "pushing one to wonder about the world's obsession with time while connecting it to the theory: make the best of it when we’re here, present and alive."

The song is written in the key of E mixolydian and a main chord progression of E-Bm-Fm. Emixolydian is the fifth mode of Amajor leading to some transcriptions using this key.

Release and music video 
Coldplay released "Clocks" in the United Kingdom on 24 March 2003 as the album's third single. The single was issued with two B-sides: "Animals", which was one of the band's favourite songs performed on tour but was not included in the album, and "Crests of Waves". The single's cover, created by Sølve Sundsbø—as with the album and its other singles—is a portrayal of Chris Martin. In the United States, while preparing "The Scientist" as the album's second release, Coldplay's US label felt the song failed to "provide enough of a blood rush for American listeners"; instead, they released "Clocks" as the second single in the US on 11 November 2002, the same day that "The Scientist" was issued in the UK.

A music video was filmed in support of the song. It was directed by British film-maker Dominic Leung, and shot at Docklands' ExCeL Building in London. It features the band performing the song, with a laser show, in front of a staged audience, mostly local college students. Stage effects and blue-red light transitions give the video a surreal feel, while a stoic crowd make up the audience. Martin has maketradefair.com scrawled on his left hand for the video to promote fair trade between countries and corporations, which can be seen at various moments throughout the video, especially when paused while he is playing piano at the 3-minute, 22-second mark. The website became defunct in 2004.

Reception and legacy 

The song received widespread acclaim from music critics. Rob Sheffield from the Rolling Stone magazine praised it as one of the album's highlights by saying that "[guitarist] Buckland shines in excellent psychedelic rockers such as 'Clocks'". David Cheal of The Daily Telegraph commented how the song features a "hypnotic piano riff, a pounding, almost frantic rhythm, and a contagious tune, all building to a gorgeously serene climax with Martin's floaty voice singing." Scott Floman, music critic for Goldmine magazine, described the track as "a stunningly pretty piano rocker, absolutely perfect and is simply one of the best songs of the decade".

The single was successful in radio throughout 2003 and appeared on several singles charts worldwide. It peaked at number nine in the United Kingdom and rose to number 29 in the United States. The song also reached number seven in Canada and number 28 in Australia. "Clocks" won a Grammy Award for Record of the Year and was ranked at number 155 on Pitchfork's "Greatest Songs of the 2000s" list as well. In October 2011, NME placed it amongst the "150 Best Tracks of the Past 15 Years". In 2013, the song was voted by listeners of BBC Radio 6 Music as the greatest release during the ten years the station had been broadcasting.

"Clocks" has been regarded as one of Coldplay's finest achievements, with the track's piano progression being their signature creation. According to The New York Times, the opening piano arpeggios of the song have been widely sampled too. Many cuts from X&Y feature influences from "Clocks", with Brian Cohen of Billboard magazine noting how it served as a "launching pad" for them in the band's third album: "several of which echo that song either in structure or feel". "Speed of Sound", the first single from X&Y, is similar to "Clocks", in that the two songs have a similar descending chord progression, with Clocks having a I v ii7 progression while Speed of Sound has a I v7 IV progression.

According to The New York Times, American singer Jordin Sparks's 2008 single "No Air" "breathes life into the overfamiliar piano line" from "Clocks". The song "Should I Go" by American singer Brandy, from her album Afrodisiac, samples the piano riff of "Clocks", as does Mexican singer Alejandro Fernández's 2007 single "Te Voy A Perder". In 2009, French DJ David Guetta in collaboration with Kelly Rowland released the song "When Love Takes Over", which has a piano introduction like that of "Clocks". A riff similar to "Clocks" was also used for the 2009 song "Shining Down" by Chicagoan hip hop artist Lupe Fiasco and featuring Matthew Santos. An analogous riff can also be heard in the DJ Cahill Remix of the Agnes song I Need You Now. In 2010, Rolling Stone placed "Clocks" at 490 on their 500 Greatest Songs of All Time list. In 2020, Bono of U2 named Clocks as one of 60 songs that saved his life. In 2021, Billboard featured "Clocks" in a list of the "100 Greatest Song Bridges of the 21st Century" as number 67.

Rankings

Remixes 
"Clocks" was remixed several times. Norwegian duo Röyksopp made a remixed version of the song, pressed on the 1000 limited-edition 12" vinyl records; 100 of which were made available through the band's official website. The release features a remixed version of "God Put A Smile Upon Your Face'" by Def Inc featuring Mr Thing. The version placed at number five in the Triple J Hottest 100, 2003 (the original version of the song placed at number 69 the previous year). In addition, there have been several other dance remixes of "Clocks", including those by Clokx and Deep Dish plus a mashup from Gabriel and Dresden's 2003 Essential Mix which appeared on various P2P networks. A remixed version of the song is included on the soundtrack of the video game Dance Dance Revolution: Hottest Party for the Wii console.

Track listings

Personnel 
 Chris Martin – lead vocals, piano, synthesizer
 Jonny Buckland – electric guitar
 Guy Berryman – bass guitar
 Will Champion – drums, backing vocals

Charts and certifications

Weekly charts

Year-end charts

Certifications

Release history

References 

Coldplay songs
2002 songs
2003 singles
British psychedelic rock songs
Capitol Records singles
Grammy Award for Record of the Year
Parlophone singles
Songs written by Guy Berryman
Songs written by Jonny Buckland
Songs written by Will Champion
Songs written by Chris Martin
Song recordings produced by Ken Nelson (British record producer)